Andrew Madoff (April 8, 1966 – September 3, 2014) was an American financier, best known for his role in exposing the financial crimes of his father, Bernie Madoff, whose Ponzi scheme has been widely described as the most successful in history.

Biography
Andrew earned a bachelor's degree in economics from the University of Pennsylvania in 1988.
He and his brother, Mark, worked for their father's firm but in a division removed from their father's deceptive practices. As the financial crisis of 2008 made markets plunge, their father was unable to maintain the deception; they later described how he confessed to them and their mother, on December 10, 2008.  Their father asked them to give him 24 hours before going to the police so he could get his affairs in order, but the brothers chose not to; their father was arrested the next day, and the brothers never spoke with him again.

Andrew Madoff married Deborah Anne West in January 1992.  According to Jerry Oppenheimer's Madoff with the Money, the pair separated in 2007; Madoff later became engaged to Catherine Hooper, claiming that they met after his separation, although that has been disputed. Madoff and Hooper announced their plans to marry and lived together for years, but his divorce had not been completed prior to his death.

Andrew was diagnosed with cancer in 2003.  His cancer went into remission, returning in 2011.  He attributed his relapse to the stress of the fallout over his father's crime. Another likely contributing factor is the fact that his brother had died by suicide in 2010, two years to the day since Bernie Madoff's arrest. Andrew Madoff died while undergoing further cancer treatment, on September 3, 2014.

Before his death, Madoff and Hooper set up an agency that specialized in grief counseling.

On his death, Reuters described ongoing attempts to sue Andrew Madoff and his brother's estate, in spite of a British court's ruling that the pair were not co-conspirators.  Irving Picard, trustee for their father's victims, sued Andrew, and sued his brother's estate, on July 15, 2014.

Madoff retained an estate of $16 million.  His will left his estranged wife a substantial fraction of his estate.  He had set up a trust which would have left $50,000 a month to Hooper and their daughter.  Hooper, however, has told reporters that the trust fund was tied up in legal disputes, that she had received no money from it, and that she was living as if she might never receive those funds.  She said she had downsized to a  apartment, where she and her daughter shared a set of bunkbeds.

References

1966 births
2014 deaths
American financiers
21st-century American businesspeople
Businesspeople from New York City
American Jews
Wharton School of the University of Pennsylvania alumni
University of Pennsylvania alumni
Deaths from cancer in New York (state)
Madoff family
Deaths from lymphoma